Alfred de Wailly (10 December 1800, Paris – 1869, Paris) was a 19th-century French lexicographer He was professor of rhetoric and the headmaster of Lycée Napoléon (collège Henri IV), general inspector and finally rector of the Academy of Bordeaux. He is the author of Dictionnaires classiques, elegant verse translation of Callimaque and various poems.

He was the son of Étienne-Augustin De Wailly and the brother of Gustave and Jules de Wailly.

Selected works 
1826: Épître à J.-J. Rousseau Read online
1861: Nouveau dictionnaire latin-français Read online
1867: Nouveau dictionnaire de versification et de poésie latines Read online

He also translated several pieces from Latin such as Consolation à Marcia, Consolation à Polybius, De la brièveté de la vie, De la clémence, De la colère, all by Seneca.

Sources

External links 
 Alfred de Wailly on data.bnf.fr

Writers from Paris
1800 births
1869 deaths
French lexicographers
Latin–French translators
19th-century translators
19th-century lexicographers